Ronald Tobias Stallworth (born February 25, 1966) is a former professional American football defensive end who played for two seasons with the New York Jets of the National Football League (NFL). At 6' 5" 262 lb., Stallworth played college football at Auburn University in Alabama.

In 1983 while attending Woodham High School in Pensacola, Florida he was named USA Today Defensive High School Player of the Year.

He later worked as a financial adviser for Merrill Lynch.

References

1966 births
Living people
American football defensive ends
Auburn Tigers football players
New York Jets players
Players of American football from Pensacola, Florida